The Eastern New Mexico Greyhounds are the athletic teams that represent Eastern New Mexico University, located in Portales, New Mexico, in NCAA Division II intercollegiate sports. The Greyhounds compete as members of the Lone Star Conference for all 12 varsity sports. Until 2015, Eastern New Mexico had used Zias for the names of female sports teams, but the school announced that Eastern New Mexico will end the use of the Zias name for the female teams, choosing to have Greyhounds for both male and female teams.

Varsity sports

Teams

Men's sports
 Baseball
 Basketball
 Cross Country
 Football
 Soccer
 Track & Field

Women's sports
 Basketball
 Cross Country
 Soccer
 Softball
 Volleyball
 Track & Field

National championships

Team

Individual teams

Basketball

The Men's Basketball team won the 1969 NAIA Basketball Championships.

Jon Dalzell played basketball for the Greyhounds and in 1981–82 averaged 15.8 points per game, and was named All Conference.

Football
There have been 15 head coaches of the football team.

Gallery

References

External links